Cissy, Cissie or Cissi may refer to :

People 
 Cissy Chandler (died 1954), wife of American author Raymond Chandler
 Cissie Caudeiron (1909–1968), Creole nationalist and folklorist
 Cissi Elwin Frenkel (born 1965), Swedish journalist and television presenter
 Zainunnisa Gool (1897–1963) anti-apartheid political and civil rights leader in South Africa, nicknamed "Cissie"
 Cissy Houston (born 1933), American singer
 Cissy Jones, American BAFTA-award-winning video game voice actress
 Cissy King (born 1946), American-born singer and dancer
 Cissi Klein (1929-1943), Norwegian Jewish girl who is commemorated every year as one of the victims of the Holocaust
 Cissy Patterson (1884-1948), American writer and newspaper owner
 Cecilia Loftus (1876–1943), Scottish actress and singer, nicknamed "Cissie" or "Cissy"
 Cecilia Östlund (born 1988), Swedish curler, nicknamed "Cissi"
 Cissie Stewart (1911–2008) British swimmer

Film and TV 
 Cissy (Pokémon), a Pokémon anime character
 Narcissa Malfoy, nicknamed "Cissy", from the Harry Potter stories
 Cissy Davis, a character in the U.S. TV series Family Affair
 A character in Cissie and Ada, a British television skit from the 1970s and 1980s
 "The Cissy", an episode of the television series South Park

Other uses 
 Cissi, an Ancient Roman name for Djinet
 "The Cissy", a song by The Action
 A British spelling variation of sissy
 Cisgender or cissexual in LGBT slang

See also 
 Sissy (disambiguation)
 Sissi (disambiguation)

Lists of people by nickname